Mohammad Hassan Khan Bridge , also known as Pol-e Mohammad Hasan Khan, lies on the Babol river in Nooshirvan Kola Road of Babol city. It is one of the ancient construction in Mazandaran Province. The bridge was constructed in the year 1146 AH. when the war between Karim Khan Zand and Mohammad Hasan Khan Qajar was over by tribal chief Mohammad Hassan Khan Qajar. Prior to its construction, in the reign of the Ghaznavids, there was a wooden bridge in the same location.

This bridge has eight springs with arch shape of Safavid architecture. It is constructed very decorative bricks. The bridge is about 140 m long, 6 m wide. It is composed of seven main bays and two secondary bays rising to the height of 11 m from the river bed.

Historically, the bridge has suffered from various earthquake and natural factors. In 1906, two piers of 9th span was flooded and  broke which was repaired by  a Barforush  merchant.  Two  arches  of  bridges  were destroyed  in earthquake  of  1820 which was repaired later.

See also
List of bridges in Iran

References

Bridges in Iran
Historic sites in Iran